Markeya Cortez ‘Tez’ Sherard (born January 18, 1982), also known as Big Tez, is a professional American drummer.  He is also a bassist, vocalist and business owner.  Sherard is currently the first call drummer and backup vocalist for Edwin McCain.

Early life
Sherard was born in the Upstate region of South Carolina.  He was raised in a family of musicians and began performing in church at the age of five years old in upstate South Carolina.  By age ten, Sherard was playing the bass guitar.  He began to travel regionally and nationally at the age of sixteen.

Career
Sherard began his touring career with R&B Band, Still Cruzin.  Following an eight-year career with Still Cruzin, Sherard launched the band Flat Front Tire with guitarist Shane Pruitt.  The band consisted of a four-piece funk rhythm section and toured together from 1998 to 2005.  

He has played with The Drifters, Clarence Frogman Henry, The Crystals, Percy Sledge, Archie Bell, Gypsy Soul, Groove Planet, The Jamie Wright Band, Darius Rucker, The Tams, Zataban, Mac Arnold, and Plate Full of Blues, to name a few.  He also plays with the Carolina Coast Band.

Sherard became the first call drummer for The Edwin McCain Band in 2008.

He has since toured throughout the United States of America and 13 countries, including two USO and MWR tours.  

Sherard received an honorary Doctorate of Music degree from the University of South Carolina for his musical efforts with Plate Full of Blues and Mac Arnold.

Sherard is endorsed by Evans Drum Heads, Innovative Percussion, and Palmetto Custom Drums.

Discography
My Heart is Sinking, Mac McCloud, (Mac McCloud, 2019)

Heat it Up, Steve Watson, (2015)

Edwin McCain Live Versions, Edwin McCain, (Sony, 2013)

New Day, Eric Weiler, (Eric Weiler, 2013) 

Ear Candy, Chocolate Thunder, (Chocolate Thunder, 2009)

References

External links
 Official Site

1982 births
African-American drummers
American soul musicians
American funk drummers
Rhythm and blues drummers
American male drummers
Soul drummers
20th-century American drummers
American session musicians
20th-century American male musicians
Living people
20th-century African-American musicians
21st-century African-American people